Taranis laevisculpta is a species of sea snail, a marine gastropod mollusk in the family Raphitomidae.

Description
The length of the shell varies between 3 mm and 7 mm.

Distribution
This marine species was found off Palermo, Sicily, Italy.

References

 Gofas, S.; Le Renard, J.; Bouchet, P. (2001). Mollusca. in: Costello, M.J. et al. (eds), European Register of Marine Species: a check-list of the marine species in Europe and a bibliography of guides to their identification. Patrimoines Naturels. 50: 180-213.

External links
 
 Monterosato T. A. (di) (1880). Conchiglie della zona degli abissi. Bullettino della Società Malacologica Italiana,, Pisa, 6: 50-82
 Gastropods.com: Taranis laevisculpta

laevisculpta
Gastropods described in 1880